Prism Genesis is an extended play by American electronic and vaporwave artist Vektroid under the alias Fuji Grid TV released on August 2, 2011. The EP was re-released as Fuji Grid TV EX in 2016 under the alias New Dreams Ltd. instead of Fuji Grid TV. This version is available on Vektroid's Bandcamp.

Track listing

References

2011 EPs
Vektroid albums
Vaporwave albums